Carolyn Breuer (born 4 July 1969) is a German jazz saxophonist (alto and soprano).

She is the daughter of jazz musician Hermann Breuer. Breuer founded her own label, NotNowMom! Records, in 2000.

Discography
 A Family Affair with Hermann Breuer (Enja, 1993)
 Simply Be with Fee Classen (Challenge, 1995)
 Acquaintance (A Records, 1997)
 Fate Smiles On Those Who Stay Cool (NotNowMom!, 2000)
 Night Moves (NotNowMom!, 2002)
 Serenade (BMG-Ariola, 2003)
 Home with Hermann Breuer (NotNowMom!, 2004)
 Amour Fou (NotNowMom!, 2005)
 Four Seasons of Life (NotNowMom!, 2013)
 Shoot the Piano Player! (NotNowMom!, 2015)

References

External links
 

Living people
1969 births
German jazz saxophonists
Women jazz saxophonists
21st-century saxophonists
21st-century women musicians